Leland High School can refer to more than one educational institution in the United States:

Leland High School (San Jose, California)
Leland High School (Leland, Illinois)
Leland High School (Leland, Mississippi)

See also 
 Lealands High School
 Leland School District